Head Full of Honey may refer to:
 Head Full of Honey (2014 film), a German drama film
 Head Full of Honey (2018 film), an American drama film, a remake of the above